Frederic Storm (July 2, 1844June 9, 1935) was a United States representative from New York. Born in Alsace in the Kingdom of France, he immigrated to the United States in 1846 with his parents, who settled in New York City. He attended the public schools of New York City and engaged in the cigar manufacturing business. He was a delegate to the New York State Constitutional Convention of 1894; and a member of the New York State Assembly (Queens Co., 2nd D.) in 1896. He was a member of the Queens County Republican committee from 1894 to 1900 and was three times its chairman. He was the founder of Flushing Hospital, and was elected as a Republican to the Fifty-seventh Congress, holding office from March 4, 1901 to March 3, 1903. He was an unsuccessful candidate for reelection in 1902 to the Fifty-eighth Congress, and after leaving Congress engaged in banking in Bayside. He founded the Bayside National Bank in 1905 and was its president until his resignation in 1920. He resided in Bayside until his death in that city in 1935; interment was in Flushing Cemetery, Flushing, New York.

References

1844 births
1935 deaths
People from Alsace
People from Queens, New York
Republican Party members of the New York State Assembly
Burials at Flushing Cemetery
Republican Party members of the United States House of Representatives from New York (state)
French emigrants to the United States